Lars Rebien Sørensen (born 10 October 1954) is a Danish businessman and former CEO of the pharmaceutical company Novo Nordisk and current chairman of the board at the Novo Nordisk Foundation (from 2018) and Novo Holdings A/S.

Biography

Education 
Lars Rebien Sørensen is a MSc forestry graduate from the Royal Veterinary and Agricultural University, now part of the University of Copenhagen (1981) and holds a master's degree from Copenhagen Business School (1983).

Career 
He was employed by Novo Nordisk in 1982 within marketing of enzymes and became sales and marketing director for the enzyme department in 1989. He joined the Group Executive Board of Novo Nordisk in 1994 and was handed the responsibility of the medical department of Novo Nordisk. In 2000 the enzyme department was de-merged from Novo Nordisk and became its own entity, Novozymes, and Lars Rebien Sørensen took over the position of CEO for Novo Nordisk, after Mads Øvlisen. From 2017 Lars Rebien Sørensen was replaced as CEO by Lars Fruergaard Jørgensen. As part of his severance package, Lars Rebien Sørensen received a "golden handshake" of 65.7 million DKK (approx. US$10.7 million). His annual salary in 2016 was 22.7 million DKK (approx. US$3.7 million).

He was CEO at Novo Nordisk from 2000 until 2016 until he was replaced by Lars Fruergaard Jørgensen.

Lars Rebien Sørensen took on the position as chairman of the board at Novo Nordisk Foundation on 1 July 2018. He is also the chairman of the board at Novo Holdings A/S. The Novo Nordisk Foundation is the foundation which is the majority shareholder in Novo Nordisk, Novozymes and NNIT (Novo Group) along with investments in more than 80 other companies within the life-sciences sector through its 100% owned subsidiary Novo Holdings A/S.

Lars Rebien Sørensen was a representative in the Danish Central bank and he holds a seat at the board of directors in Axcel Management A/S, Thermo Fischer Scientific Inc. (USA), Essity AB (Sweden), Jungbunzlauer Suisse AG (Switzerland) and Novo Holdings A/S.

Board member positions 
Lars Rebien Sørensen currently holds the following board member seats:

 Novo Nordisk Foundation – Chairman of the board
 Novo Holdings A/S – Chairman of the board
 Axcel Management A/S – Vice Chairman of the board
 Thermo Fischer Scientific Inc. (USA) – Board member
 Essity AB (Sweden) – Board member
 Jungbunzlauer Suisse AG (Switzerland) – Board member
 Ferring Pharmaceuticals – chairman of the board

Private life 
Lars Rebien Sørensen is married to Charlotte Idin Sørensen and they have three children.

Recognition 
Lars Rebien Sørensen was awarded the "World's Best CEO" by Harvard Business Review in 2015 and 2016.

References 

1954 births
Living people